Himalayan Bank Limited (HBL) is one of the largest private banks in Nepal. The Bank was incorporated in 1992 by a few eminent individuals of Nepal in partnership with the Employees Provident Fund and Habib Bank Limited of Pakistan. The bank commenced its operations in January 1993. Himalayan Bank is also the first commercial bank of Nepal with most of its shares held by the private sector of Nepal. Besides commercial banking services, the bank also offers industrial and merchant banking service.

With its head and corporate office at Kamaladi, Kathmandu, the bank has 71 branches. Eighteen of its branches are located inside the Kathmandu Valley while the rest are spread across the nation (Kathmandu Valley comprises Kathmandu, Lalitpur and Bhaktapur Districts). Besides, a branch looking exclusively at electronic cards and related products, is based in Patan, Lalitpur.

Mr. Ashoke SJB Rana is the Chief Executive Officer of the Bank. Among the top management are Mr. Ujjal Rajbhandary, General Manager and Mr. Anup Maskey, General Manager.

External links
 Official Website

References

Aga Khan Development Network
Banks of Nepal
Banks established in 1993
1993 establishments in Nepal